Riddoch may refer to:
Riddoch syndrome
Riddoch Highway
Alexander Riddoch, eight times Provost of Dundee
Dave Riddoch, Scottish footballer
George Riddoch, Australian politician
Greg Riddoch, American baseballer
Ian Riddoch, Scottish chief executive
John Riddoch, Australian politician
Lesley Riddoch, British journalist